Porthecla is a Neotropical genus of butterflies in the family Lycaenidae.

Species
Porthecla annette Faynel & R.K. Robbins, 2011
Porthecla barba (Druce, 1907)
Porthecla dinus (Hewitson, 1867)
Porthecla forasteira Faynel & A. Moser, 2011
Porthecla gemma (Druce, 1907)
Porthecla johanna Faynel & R.K. Robbins, 2011
Porthecla minyia (Hewitson, 1867)
Porthecla peruensis Faynel & A. Moser, 2011
Porthecla porthura (Druce, 1907)
Porthecla prietoi Faynel & Busby, 2011
Porthecla ravus (Druce, 1907)
Porthecla willmotti Busby, Faynel & A. Moser, 2011

Former species
Oenomaus melleus (Druce, 1907)

References

 , 2011: Species level taxonomy of the Neotropical hairstreak genus Porthecla (Lepidoptera: Lycaenidae: Theclinae: Eumaeini). Annales de la Société Entomologique de France (n.s.), 47(1-2): 241-259.

Eumaeini
Lycaenidae of South America
Lycaenidae genera